The Rochester Jr. Americans were a Tier III Junior A ice hockey team from Rochester, New York. Their top team most recently played in the USPHL in the Premier Division while also fielding a team in the Elite Division.

History

In 1996, the Syracuse Junior Crunch were founded to play Canadian Junior A in the Metro Junior A Hockey League, which was absorbed by the Ontario Provincial Junior A Hockey League in 1998. The team moved to Auburn that year, and was renamed the Auburn Junior Crunch. In 2005 the franchise was sold and renamed the Syracuse Stars, joining the American Tier III Junior A Eastern Junior Hockey League (EJHL). While they played in Syracuse, they also had a Junior B team in the Empire Junior Hockey League (EmJHL).

On December 9, 2009, Maksymum Hockey LLC, based in Rochester, New York, announced plans to operate the Stars and move them to Rochester beginning with the 2010–11 season. During this time they were called the Rochester Stars and were affiliated with the Tier III Junior B Maksymum Junior Hockey Club in the (EmJHL) and were no longer affiliated with the Junior B Syracuse Stars that continued to play in the EmJHL. The Rochester Stars began playing at the Bill Gray's Regional Iceplex.

In 2013, the EJHL dissolved after several members left to form the United States Premier Hockey League. By the beginning of the 2013–14 season, the Stars joined the USPHL in the Elite and Empire Divisions (with the former EJHL team in Elite and the former EmJHL team in the Empire). Both teams were renamed to the Rochester Jr. Americans.

In 2014, the Jr. Americans promoted their Elite Division Tier III team to the USPHL's Premier Division for the 2014–15 season and began playing against many of the former EJHL members. For the 2015–16 season they switched their team from the Empire Division (recently renamed USP3 Division) to the Elite Division. In 2016, the USPHL removed the Jr. Americans from the league and announced a new organization called the Rochester Jr. Monarchs would take their place in the Elite and youth divisions.

Team members and regular season
The Rochester Jr. Americans held tryouts in April of each year. The season started the day after Labor Day and playoffs finished during the third week of March each year. The schedule included 44 USPHL Premier regular season games plus three rounds of playoffs.

Season-by-season records

Alumni
In addition to those players which have gone on to play for various college teams, a number of former Stars players have gone on to play at the NHL level, including the following:

 Ryan Callahan of the Tampa Bay Lightning
 Tim Connolly
 Colby Cohen
 Jeremy Morin of the Tampa Bay Lightning
 Matt Murley
 Rob Schremp
 Tim Sestito
 Tom Sestito

References

External links

USPHL website

Defunct Ontario Provincial Junior A Hockey League teams
Rochester Stars
Ice hockey teams in New York (state)
1996 establishments in New York (state)
Ice hockey clubs established in 1996